A Gang Show is a theatrical performance by members of Scouts and Guides. The shows are produced with the dual aims of providing a learning opportunity for young people in the performing arts, as well as contributing to the artistic and cultural growth of their local community.

Gang Shows will have members of all ages involved, however the on-stage performers are often limited to current Youth Members (those being aged under 25 in most cases). A large amount of other areas will have members of all ages, including backstage, technical, administration, management and other areas.

Gang Shows are entirely volunteer run, and often feature a majority of work written by Scouting and Guiding members. This may be new work, or may be existing works adapted to suit the show's intended narrative.

The shows may be a simple affair in a local scout hall, but are often more involved and take place in a local theater. A season may only run for a single weekend, but performance seasons lasting one or two weeks are common. Tickets to these shows are often available to the public, and can be a useful tool to engage the local community in Scouting.

Gang Show format
The format is a revue or variety show; song, dance and short comedy sketches are the most common. The number of items varies between 12 and 25, some stand-alone, others a series of songs to a chosen theme or a running gag.

The format was created by Ralph Reader, who wrote material including the signature tune, "Crest of a Wave". Other standards Reader wrote include "Strolling", "Great Great Game", "Gee, It's A Wonderful life", "Gee, It's Great To Be Young", "A Touch of Silver", "Three Cheers", "Show Time", "Together", "These are the Times" and "The Scout Hymn".

History

In 1931, Reader, a Rover Scout trying to make his mark in theatre in the US and London, was asked to write a Scout-based variety show to raise money for a swimming pool at Downe Scout Camp (now a Scout Association National Activity Centre). Rehearsals began under Reader's direction on 25 May 1932, his 29th birthday.

Initially the show did not have a title, but during a rehearsal break, Reader recalled, he asked a cast member if everyone was ready, to which the response was "Aye, aye Skip, the gang's all here". The first production, The Gang's All Here, ran between 30 October and 1 November 1932 at the Scala Theatre in central London.

The show was not a sell-out but enough was raised to fund the swimming pool and the show was well received. Baden-Powell, the founder of Scouting, persuaded Reader to produce another show in 1933. This was The Gang Comes Back and ran for a week.

Reader continued to write and produce the London Gang Show. In 1934, the show became The Gang Show, and "Crest of a Wave" was performed for the first time, becoming over the years the anthem.

In 1937, the London show became the first amateur production to have a Royal Command Performance (an honour repeated in 1957 and 1964). A feature film called The Gang Show, starring Ralph Reader and The Gang, premièred at the Lyceum Theatre, London in April the same year, and in New York in December 1938.

Organisation

When the Gang Show started in London in 1932, Reader organised the cast as a Scout Troop; an arrangement which persists only in a few shows now, mainly in Australia and New Zealand. Members of the first troop wanted an identifying feature, deciding on a red scarf or necker. The red scarf has become a worldwide symbol, and to distinguish shows, an insignia in gold thread (UK: the initials GS in Reader's handwriting shot through with the show's name - AUS: usually a design related to the masks of comedy and tragedy and incorporating the show's name) is embroidered into the point of the scarf. Ralph Reader was originally called "The Holborn Rover" and was with the 4th Holborn Group whose scarf was half red and half green. Reader chose to have the Gang Show scarf red to be part of the 4th Holborn.

Members of shows in the United Kingdom used to only be allowed to wear the scarlet scarf if they were nationally recognised, i.e. they came up to prescribed minimum standards of performance and production. It is now worn by almost all Gang Shows. While 'National Recognition' is no longer a thing, UK shows still need to be regularly assessed (every five years) in order to maintain standards.

In 1972, Reader founded the London Gang Show Fellowship so current and former members of the London show could keep in touch. Membership later expanded to anyone interested in Gang Show, and the LGSF still meets annually.

Gang Shows around the world

Since the first in London, productions have been organised around the world, Ireland, Australia, New Zealand and Canada. While individual in character, they share the ethos of Reader's concept and have common elements, often including a finale performance of "Crest of a Wave".

In 1958 Reader went to Chicago to produce and direct the first Gang Show in America.  He returned to Chicago next year to guide the second. Reader first went to Chicago in 1920 as a teenager and began his stage career there.

Newcastle Gang Show started in April 1937 followed by Peterborough Gang Show in November 1937 and apart from the war years has run ever since. Harpenden Gang Show has performed every year since 1949, making it the longest continuously running Gang Show in the world.  

In the United States, the only known Gang Show in existence is performed annually in Derby, Connecticut, produced by BSA Troop 3, Pack 3 and Venture Crew 33 since 1924, also making it one of the world's oldest continuous Gang Shows.

Gang Show spin offs 
In some countries an over-18 only show often referred to as a Bag Show are produced, often with a dinner and a more cabaret style and with more adult content such as risque jokes and burlesque elements. This is done for Rover Scouts and leaders.

In Melbourne, Australia the Showtimes came out of the strong theatre culture of the area. These are smaller than the local Gang Show, with the exception of Whitehorse Showtime which is actually the largest show in the Southern Hemisphere, originally pulling from a single district to produce a show. Currently there are four of these shows; Whitehorse Showtime, South Metro Showtime, Camberwell Showtime and Strzelecki Showtime. Because these showtimes are not Gang Shows, they do not have the red scarf instead choosing a different colour, such as Strzelecki Showtime's gold scarf.

Signature tunes

"On the Crest of a Wave" has become the signature tune throughout the world and is usually performed at the end. It may be sung as just the chorus (traditionally twice, the first time with gusto, the second part-quiet and staccato, part with gusto once more) but there are also two verses.

"A Touch of Silver" (sometimes referred to as "Silver on the Scarlet"), written by Reader and Brisbane Gang Show producer Hugh "Kirra" McKee, is the signature tune of the Brisbane Gang Show and may be sung by any show that has performed for at least 25 seasons.

See also

Ralph Reader

References

Bibliography
 Reader, Ralph This is The Gang Show, C. Arthur Pearson Ltd [London], 1957
 Reader, Ralph Ralph Reader Remembers, Bailey Brothers and Swinfen [London], 1975

External links

World Wide Forum
Audio – Gang show anthem of On the crest of a wave
Gang Show Forum

Global Gangshow
Gang Shows around the world

History
History of Ralph Reader and the Gang Show
The London Gang Show Fellowship

Theatrical genres
Scouting events
Variety shows